Do Borji (also Romanized as Do Borjī) is a city in Forg Rural District, Forg District, Darab County, Fars Province, Iran. At the 2006 census, its population was 2,500, in 548 families.

References 

Populated places in Darab County
Cities in Fars Province